"More Human than Human" is a song by the American heavy metal band White Zombie from their album Astro-Creep: 2000 (1995).  It was released as the first official single from the album and is also included on Rob Zombie's Past, Present & Future, the greatest hits album The Best of Rob Zombie, and a remix is included on Supersexy Swingin' Sounds and Revolutions.

Music and lyrics
The title and lyrics reference the novel Do Androids Dream of Electric Sheep? by Philip K. Dick, adapted in film as Blade Runner. The title was the slogan of the Tyrell Corporation, manufacturers of the very humaniform biological androids, or "replicants" that are the focal point of the story. "I want more life, fucker" (quoted in the lyrics) is one of the last things his creator hears when the replicant designed to be the perfect – and disposable – soldier (Rutger Hauer) finds him and is denied a reprieve from the programmed 4 year life span.

The song features a repeated slide guitar figure, a technique typically associated with blues music.

The moaning in the intro to the song was sampled from a post-apocalyptic porn movie called Café Flesh directed by Stephen Sayadian.

Reception
"More Human than Human" quickly became the band's highest-charting and most recognizable single in the entirety of their career. The song earned them their second Grammy nomination for Best Metal Performance in 1995. The song was named the 68th best hard rock song of all time by VH1.

The song was listed on PopMatterss "The 10 Best Alternative Metal Singles of the 1990s" list.

"More Human than Human" was ranked at number 43 on Spins "The 95 Best Alternative Rock Songs of 1995" list.

Music video
The music video of "More Human than Human," the first video made for Astro-Creep: 2000, features White Zombie playing the track in a room and short clips of old home video footage of Rob, his brother, Michael Cummings (better known as Spider One of the band Powerman 5000), and a cousin at a young age. Part of the video was also shot in the halls of Framingham High School, Framingham, Massachusetts, as well as on the streets of Hollywood Boulevard. It was the first video that had been completely directed by Rob alone. In 1995, he won the MTV Video Music Award for Hard Rock Video for this music video. At the time, it was Rob's favorite White Zombie music video.

Charts

See also
List of RPM Rock/Alternative number-one singles (Canada)

References

White Zombie (band) songs
1995 singles
1995 songs
Industrial rock songs
Geffen Records singles
Song recordings produced by Terry Date
Alternative metal songs